São Jorge, Portuguese for Saint George, may refer to the following places:

Brazil
São Jorge, Alto Paraíso de Goiás, is a village in the State of Goiás
São Jorge d'Oeste, a municipality in the state of Paraná 
São Jorge, Rio Grande do Sul, is a municipality in the State of Rio Grande do Sul 
São Jorge, São Paulo, is a bairro (neighbourhood) in the city of São Paulo

Cape Verde
São Jorge, Cape Verde, a village in the municipality of São Filipe, Fogo
São Jorge (Santiago), a settlement in the municipality of São Lourenço dos Órgãos, Santiago

Ghana
São Jorge da Mina, present-day Elmina, Ghana (formerly the Gold Coast)

Portugal
Caldas de São Jorge, town in the civil parish of São Jorge, in the municipality of Santa Maria da Feira 
Castle of São Jorge, a Moorish castle located in the center of Lisbon 
São Jorge (Arcos de Valdevez), a civil parish in the municipality of Arcos de Valdevez
São Jorge de Arroios, a civil parish within the city of Lisbon
São Jorge da Beira, a civil parish in the municipality of Covilhã
São Jorge do Selho, a civil parish in the municipality of Guimarães
São Jorge de Vizela, a civil parish within the city of Vizela

In the Azores:
São Jorge Island, an island in the Central Group

In Madeira:
Arco de São Jorge, a civil parish in the municipality of Santana
São Jorge (Santana), a civil parish in the municipality of Santana

See also
 Saint George (disambiguation) - English